This is a list of biological virus families and subfamilies. See also Comparison of computer viruses

This is an alphabetical list of biological virus families and subfamilies; it includes those families and subfamilies listed by the ICTV 2020 report.

For a list of individual species, see List of virus species.
For a list of virus genera, see List of virus genera.
 For a list of virus realms, subrealms, kingdoms, subkingdoms, phyla, subphyla, classes, subclasses, orders, and suborders, see List of higher virus taxa.

Families

A

 Abyssoviridae
 Ackermannviridae
 Adenoviridae
 Adintoviridae
 Aliusviridae
 Alloherpesviridae
 Alphaflexiviridae
 Alphasatellitidae
 Alphatetraviridae
 Alvernaviridae
 Amalgaviridae
 Amnoonviridae
 Ampullaviridae
 Anelloviridae
 Arenaviridae
 Arteriviridae
 Artoviridae
 Ascoviridae
 Asfarviridae
 Aspiviridae
 Astroviridae
 Atkinsviridae
 Autographiviridae
 Avsunviroidae

B

 Bacilladnaviridae
 Baculoviridae
 Barnaviridae
 Belpaoviridae
 Benyviridae
 Betaflexiviridae
 Bicaudaviridae
 Bidnaviridae
 Birnaviridae
 Blumeviridae
 Bornaviridae
 Botourmiaviridae
 Bromoviridae

C

 Caliciviridae
 Carmotetraviridae
 Caulimoviridae
 Chaseviridae
 Chrysoviridae
 Chuviridae
 Circoviridae
 Clavaviridae
 Closteroviridae
 Coronaviridae
 Corticoviridae
 Cremegaviridae
 Crepuscuviridae
 Cruliviridae
 Curvulaviridae
 Cystoviridae

D
 Deltaflexiviridae
 Demerecviridae
 Dicistroviridae
 Drexlerviridae
 Duinviridae

E
 Endornaviridae
 Euroniviridae

F
 Fiersviridae
 Filoviridae
 Fimoviridae
 Finnlakeviridae
 Flaviviridae
 Fuselloviridae

G
 Gammaflexiviridae
 Geminiviridae
 Genomoviridae
 Globuloviridae
 Gresnaviridae
 Guelinviridae
 Guttaviridae

H
 Halspiviridae
 Hantaviridae
 Hepadnaviridae
 Hepeviridae
 Herelleviridae
 Herpesviridae
 Hypoviridae
 Hytrosaviridae

I
 Iflaviridae
 Inoviridae
 Iridoviridae

K
 Kitaviridae
 Kolmioviridae

L
 Lavidaviridae
 Leishbuviridae
 Lipothrixviridae
 Lispiviridae

M

 Malacoherpesviridae
 Marnaviridae
 Marseilleviridae
 Matonaviridae
 Matshushitaviridae
 Mayoviridae
 Medioniviridae
 Megabirnaviridae
 Mesoniviridae
 Metaviridae
 Metaxyviridae
 Microviridae
 Mimiviridae
 Mitoviridae
 Mononiviridae
 Mymonaviridae
 Myoviridae
 Mypoviridae
 Myriaviridae

N
 Nairoviridae
 Nanghoshaviridae
 Nanhypoviridae
 Nanoviridae
 Narnaviridae
 Natareviridae
 Nimaviridae
 Nodaviridae
 Nudiviridae
 Nyamiviridae

O
 Olifoviridae
 Orthomyxoviridae
 Ovaliviridae

P

 Papillomaviridae
 Paramyxoviridae
 Partitiviridae
 Parvoviridae
 Paulinoviridae
 Peribunyaviridae
 Permutotetraviridae
 Phasmaviridae
 Phenuiviridae
 Phycodnaviridae
 Picobirnaviridae
 Picornaviridae
 Plasmaviridae
 Plectroviridae
 Pleolipoviridae
 Pneumoviridae
 Podoviridae
 Polycipiviridae
 Polydnaviridae
 Polymycoviridae
 Polyomaviridae
 Portogloboviridae
 Pospiviroidae
 Potyviridae
 Poxviridae
 Pseudoviridae

Q
 Qinviridae
 Quadriviridae

R
 Redondoviridae
 Reoviridae
 Retroviridae
 Rhabdoviridae
 Roniviridae
 Rountreeviridae
 Rudiviridae

S

 Salasmaviridae
 Sarthroviridae
 Schitoviridae
 Secoviridae
 Simuloviridae
 Sinhaliviridae
 Siphoviridae
 Smacoviridae
 Solemoviridae
 Solinviviridae
 Solspiviridae
 Sphaerolipoviridae
 Spiraviridae
 Steitzviridae
 Sunviridae

T

 Tectiviridae
 Thaspiviridae
 Tobaniviridae
 Togaviridae
 Tolecusatellitidae
 Tombusviridae
 Tospoviridae
 Totiviridae
 Tristromaviridae
 Turriviridae
 Tymoviridae

V
 Virgaviridae

W
 Wupedeviridae

X
 Xinmoviridae

Y
 Yueviridae

Z
 Zobellviridae

Subfamilies

A

Actantavirinae
Agantavirinae
Aglimvirinae
Alphaherpesvirinae
Alphairidovirinae
Alpharhabdovirinae
Arquatrovirinae
Avulavirinae
Azeredovirinae

B

Bastillevirinae
Bclasvirinae
Beephvirinae
Beijerinckvirinae
Betaherpesvirinae
Betairidovirinae
Betarhabdovirinae
Braunvirinae
Brockvirinae
Bronfenbrennervirinae
Bullavirinae

C

Calvusvirinae
Ceronivirinae
Chebruvirinae
Chimanivirinae
Chordopoxvirinae
Cleopatravirinae
Cobavirinae
Colwellvirinae
Comovirinae
Corkvirinae
Crocarterivirinae
Crustonivirinae
Cvivirinae

D
Dclasvirinae
Deejayvirinae
Denniswatsonvirinae
Densovirinae
Dolichocephalovirinae

E

Eekayvirinae
Emmerichvirinae
Enquatrovirinae
Entomopoxvirinae
Equarterivirinae
Ermolyevavirinae
Erskinevirinae
Eucampyvirinae

F
Firstpapillomavirinae
Fuhrmanvirinae

G

Gammaherpesvirinae
Gammarhabdovirinae
Geminialphasatellitinae
Gochnauervirinae
Gofosavirinae
Gokushovirinae
Gorgonvirinae
Guernseyvirinae
Gutmannvirinae

H
Hamaparvovirinae
Hendrixvirinae
Heroarterivirinae
Hexponivirinae
Humphriesvirinae
Hyporhamsavirinae

J
Jasinkavirinae

K
Krylovirinae

L
Langleyhallvirinae
Letovirinae

M

Mammantavirinae
Markadamsvirinae
Mccleskeyvirinae
Mccorquodalevirinae
Mclasvirinae
Medionivirinae
Melnykvirinae
Metaparamyxovirinae
Migulavirinae
Molineuxvirinae
Mononivirinae

N
Nanoalphasatellitinae
Nclasvirinae
Nefertitivirinae
Northropvirinae
Nymbaxtervirinae

O
Okabevirinae
Okanivirinae
Orthocoronavirinae
Orthoparamyxovirinae
Orthoretrovirinae
Ounavirinae

P

Parvovirinae
Pclasvirinae
Peduovirinae
Petromoalphasatellitinae
Picovirinae
Piscanivirinae
Pontosvirinae
Procedovirinae

Q
Queuovirinae
Quinvirinae

R

Rakietenvirinae
Regressovirinae
Remotovirinae
Repantavirinae
Reternivirinae
Rhodovirinae
Rodepovirinae
Rogunavirinae
Rothmandenesvirinae
Rubulavirinae

S

Sarlesvirinae
Secondpapillomavirinae
Sedoreovirinae
Sepvirinae
Serpentovirinae
Simarterivirinae
Skryabinvirinae
Slopekvirinae
Spinareovirinae
Spounavirinae
Spumaretrovirinae
Studiervirinae

T

Tatarstanvirinae
Tempevirinae
Tevenvirinae
Tiamatvirinae
Torovirinae
Trabyvirinae
Trivirinae
Tunavirinae
Tunicanivirinae
Twarogvirinae
Twortvirinae
Tybeckvirinae

V
Variarterivirinae
Vequintavirinae

Z
Zealarterivirinae

See also

 List of higher virus taxa
 List of virus genera
 List of virus species
 List of virus taxa
 Table of clinically important viruses
 Virology
 Virus
 Virus classification
 Wikipedia:WikiProject Viruses
 WikiSpecies:Virus

References

External links

 ICTV
 Master Species Lists at International Committee on Taxonomy of Viruses (ICTV)

Families